The Agaram Cemetery is an old Protestant cemetery in Bangalore. Located inside the land of the Army Service Corps and behind the Army Officers Mess, it is the oldest Christian cemetery in Bangalore and is not publicly accessible. The oldest grave from 1808 is that of Sgt. Major Kelly, HM 59th Regiment of Foot. Two 40 foot ionic columns commemorate officers of his Majesty's 13th Light Dragoons. The cemetery was used until 1870. The cemetery was overgrown and was partly restored through the activism of Admiral Oscar Stanley Dawson.

References

External links 
 Agram cemetery
 List of graves
 

1808 establishments in British India
1870 disestablishments in British India
Buildings and structures in Bangalore
Cemeteries in India